Frode Estil (born 31 May 1972 in Lierne, Nord-Trøndelag) is a retired Norwegian cross-country skier. He lives in Meråker with his wife Grete whom he married in the summer of 2001. They have two sons, Bernhard, born in August 2002, and Konrad. Estil was classical specialist and also a specialist at succeeding in World Championships and Olympics. While Estil only won four World Cup races, he won one individual Olympic Gold and one individual World Championship gold. In addition, he won three team events in the World Championships and another team gold in the Olympics.

World Cup
Estil's first World Cup victory was in 1999 in the 30 km event at Davos. His best standing at the end of a season was during 2001/02 when he finished fifth. Estil has been competing in the World Cup since 1995/96, in which he finished the season in 42nd place, and in 1996/97 he finished 63rd. The year after however he jumped up to 12th. The following two years he finished 19th and 12th. Finally, in the 2000/01 season, he finished inside the top ten of the world, finishing eight. The next season (2001/02) was even better for Estil, not only did he get married in the summer but he finished in fifth place overall, his ever highest overall ranking. The next two seasons he finished in sixth. After the 2002/03 season he stopped competing in the sprint events after finishing the season in 58th, he had finished the sprint seasons in 48th (1996/97), 18th (1997/98), 18th (1998/99), 32nd (1999/00), and 39th in 2001/02. In 2003/04 he finished third in the distance standings. 2004/05 was a poor season, finishing 14th in the distance, and 25th in the overall. Estil finished the 2005/06 season in ninth place in the FIS World Cup standings, 456 points behind winner Tobias Angerer. Estil finished fourth in the distance, 420 points behind Angerer, and again did not compete in the sprints.

Estil has had 18 World Cup podium finishes. Four of them in the first place, six in second place and eight in third place. His wins came in 1999/00, 2002/03 and two in 2003/04. The most podium finishes he has had in a single season was in 2002/03, where he had four (one win, two second, and one third). He had three podiums in the seasons either side of that season. All of his wins have been in the classic style, except one double pursuit (in which the first half of the race is in the classical technique).

The 15 km is his most successful event in terms of numbers of podium finishes. Through the years he has had one win, three second places and three third places. His most successful event in terms of wins is the 30 km, where he has had three victories (also one second and one third).

World Championships
Estil's first gold medal in an international championship  was in the relay in the FIS Nordic World Ski Championships 2001 in Lahti, where he also took silver in the 30 km.

At the FIS Nordic World Ski Championships 2003, held in Val di Fiemme, Estil won a gold in the 4 × 10 km relay and bronze in the 15 km and 30 km.

At the 2005 FIS Nordic World Ski Championships in Oberstdorf, Estil won gold in the 50 km race, and the 4 × 10 km relay. In the 50 km race he won in a time of 2:30:10.1, beating Anders Aukland by 0.7 seconds, and Odd-Bjørn Hjelmeset came third making it a Norwegian sweep. A characteristic of Estil is to start slow and then come through the pack towards the end of the race, he was 23rd after 12.5 km, and 11th after 27.5 km, but by 42.5 km he was third, and came through to win. In the relay, Norway (Hjelmeset, Estil, biathlete Lars Berger, and Tore Ruud Hofstad) won, with Germany second and Russia third. Norway finished 17.7 seconds ahead of the Germans, with Estil skiing Norway's second fastest leg (behind Berger). He also won a bronze medal in the 15 km + 15 km double pursuit, in a time of 1:19:21.3, 0.8 seconds behind winner Vincent Vittoz, and losing silver to Giorgio Di Centa in a photo finish.

At the 2007 FIS Nordic World Ski Championships in Sapporo, Estil won only one medal. He lost the gold at the finish line of the 50 km event to fellow Norwegian Odd-Bjørn Hjelmeset. Estil has nine World Championship medals as of the Sapporo championships with four gold, two silver, and three bronze.

Olympics
Estil has competed in two Winter Olympics. In the 2002 Games Estil won golds in the 10 km + 10 km combined pursuit, and the 4 × 10 km relay; and won a silver in the 15 km. In the 2006 Winter Olympics he won a silver medal in the 15 km + 15 km double pursuit.

In the 10 km + 10 km combined pursuit, Estil tied with fellow Norwegian Thomas Alsgaard for second place, with Johann Mühlegg winning the race. However Mühlegg was found guilty of doping and disqualified by the IOC in February 2004, therefore upgrading Estil and Alsgaard to joint gold medalists. Alsgaard and Estil clocked times of 49:48.9, 4 seconds ahead of Per Elofsson.

In the same Olympic Games, he also won a silver medal in the 15 km Classic race, and a gold medal in the 4 × 10 km relay together with Alsgaard, Kristen Skjeldal and Anders Aukland. Estil finished the 15 km race in 37:43.4, 36 seconds behind Andrus Veerpalu of Estonia, and 7.4 seconds ahead of Jaak Mae also of Estonia. Estil also took part in the 50 km classic, but finished ninth, in a time of 2:10:44.8, 4:22.0 behind winner Mikhail Ivanov of Russia.

At the 2006 Olympics in Turin, Italy, Estil won the silver medal in the men's 15 km + 15 km double pursuit competition despite taking a fall and breaking a ski at the start of the race which put him in last place. Eugeni Dementiev of Russia won the race, 1.6 seconds ahead of Estil, who finished the race in 1:17:01.8, 0.3 seconds ahead of Pietro Piller Cottrer who came third. In the same Games Estil also took part in the 15 km classical, and the 50 km freestyle mass start, but finished 17th and 28th respectively. Estil's results mirrored those of the Norwegian cross-country team who failed to win a single Gold medal in Turin, owing to stomach illness and waxing mistakes made by Norway's eight man strong service team.

Estil's Olympic medals include two golds and two silvers..

Medical
Estil has a high hemoglobin level, and has received a blood-certificate by the FIS, so that when his blood is tested the maximum hemoglobin allowed to race is 17.5 grams hemoglobin per 100 ml of blood, compared to 17 grams for men and 16 grams per 100 ml for athletes without this certificate.

Legacy
Estil has had a hill in Soldier Hollow, Utah, United States, (where the cross country skiing and biathlon events of the 2002 Winter Olympics took place) named after him after his three medals.
Frode Estil was named Norwegian sportsman of the year in 2001.
Estil received the Holmenkollen Medal in 2007 (Shared with Simon Ammann, Odd-Bjørn Hjelmeset, King Harald V, and Queen Sonja).

Cross-country skiing results
All results are sourced from the International Ski Federation (FIS).

Olympic Games
 4 medals – (2 gold, 2 silver)

World Championships
 9 medals – (4 gold, 2 silver, 3 bronze)

World Cup

Season standings

Individual podiums
 4 victories 
 20 podiums

Team podiums
 9 victories – (9 ) 
 16 podiums – (15 , 1 )

Notes and references

External links

 
 Frode Estil's official website 
 Holmenkollen medal presented to Estil and Hjelmeset  - Accessed March 21, 2007 
 2007 Holmenkollen medalists announced - Accessed March 18, 2007. 
 Short video of Frode being wished good luck by the Leeds manager 

1972 births
Living people
People from Lierne
People from Meråker
Cross-country skiers at the 2002 Winter Olympics
Cross-country skiers at the 2006 Winter Olympics
Holmenkollen medalists
Norwegian male cross-country skiers
Olympic cross-country skiers of Norway
Olympic gold medalists for Norway
Olympic silver medalists for Norway
Olympic medalists in cross-country skiing
FIS Nordic World Ski Championships medalists in cross-country skiing
Medalists at the 2006 Winter Olympics
Medalists at the 2002 Winter Olympics
Sportspeople from Trøndelag
21st-century Norwegian people